Verkhnyaya Maksakovka (Vylys Maksakovka) is an urban locality (an urban-type settlement) under the administrative jurisdiction of the city of republic significance of Syktyvkar in the Komi Republic, Russia. As of the 2010 Census, its population was 4,198.

History
In 1983–1990, Verkhnyaya Maksakovka was a microdistrict of Syktyvkar and did not exist as a standalone inhabited locality.

Administrative and municipal status
Within the framework of administrative divisions, the urban-type settlement of Verkhnyaya Maksakovka, together with two rural localities, is incorporated as Verkhnyaya Maksakovka Urban-Type Settlement Administrative Territory, which is subordinated to the city of republic significance of Syktyvkar. Within the framework of municipal divisions, Verkhnyaya Maksakovka is a part of Syktyvkar Urban Okrug.

References

Notes

Sources

Urban-type settlements in the Komi Republic
Syktyvkar
